The Krafsidonas is, with a length of , the longest torrent that runs solely within the interior of Volos, Greece. It has its origin in the central Pelion Mountains, flowing southwest to the Pagasetic Gulf.

The places that the river flows through include Volos, Nea Ionia, Portaria in Greece. There are a number of bridges over the river.

2000s floods

October 10, 2006
The city of Volos was flooded on October 10, 2006, one of the prefecture's worst recorded floods. The flood devastated crops and groves and many homes. A railroad bridge connecting Volos and Larissa collapsed when the central stone support was ruined by a combination of rocks, mud and debris carried by a swollen river. Almost one fifth of the city faced severe mudslides.

See also
 List of rivers of Greece

Rivers of Greece
Landforms of Magnesia (regional unit)
Rivers of Thessaly
Drainage basins of the Aegean Sea

el:Έβρος (Θράκη)
es:Krausidon